Palavalasa is a village in Srikakulam district of the Indian state of Andhra Pradesh. It is located in Sompeta mandal.

Demographics
Palavalasa village has population of 2,654 of which 1,157 are males while 1,497 are females as per Population 2011, Indian Census.

References

Villages in Srikakulam district